Pleuropappus is a genus of Australian plants in the pussy's-toes tribe within the daisy family.

Species
The only known species is Pleuropappus phyllocalymmeus, found only in South Australia. Common name is silver candles.

References

Gnaphalieae
Flora of South Australia
Monotypic Asteraceae genera
Taxa named by Ferdinand von Mueller